The Lockwitztal tramway, known in German as the Lockwitztalbahn, was a metre gauge interurban tramway in the German state of Saxony.

History
The line connected the Dresden suburb of Niedersedlitz with the adjoining municipality of Kreischa. It opened in 1906, and was replaced by a bus service in 1977.

On closure, several of the Lockwitztal Tramway's cars were transferred to the Kirnitzschtal tramway. One of these cars (240 005) is now preserved at the Dresden Tram Museum, whilst another (240 008) is still used on occasional heritage services on the Kirnitzschtal Tramway.

See also 
Trams in Dresden
Lößnitz tramway

External links 
  
 The Lockwitztal Tramway at bahninfo.net (in German)
 The Lockwitztal Tramway on Stadtwiki Dresden (in German)

Interurban railways
Tram transport in Germany
Transport in Dresden
Transport in Saxony
Metre gauge railways in Germany
Defunct town tramway systems by city
History of Dresden